Éditions Russes de Musique was a music publishing company operating in Germany, Russia, France, the UK and the USA.

It was founded in 1909 by Serge Koussevitzky and his first wife Natalia and focussed on new Russian music. 

In 1914 a related independent imprint was formed based on the German company Gutheil which Koussevitzky purchased for the purpose.

The headquarters moved to Paris in 1920, after the Russian revolution. The firm was sold to Boosey & Hawkes on March 1, 1947.

Names of imprints

Russischer Musikverlag
Editions Russes de Musique 
Édition russe de musique
Rossiyskoe muzykalnoye izdatelstvo (Российское музыкальное издательство)
A. Gutheil (1914-1947)

Plates

IMSLP catalogues printing plates from dates ranging from 1909 to 1938, covering composers both well-known and less well-known.

References

Principal source: The New Grove Dictionary of Music and Musicians, edited by Stanley Sadie. New York and London: Macmillan Publications, 1980

Sheet music publishing companies
Music organizations based in Russia
Music publishing companies of Germany